This is a list of FM & AM radio stations in Asunción, Paraguay, and their frequencies. These are 29 FM and 17 AM stations in Asunción.

FM (MHz)

 Conquistador FM 89.1
 Radio Viva 90.1 
 Web Radios de Paraguay 
 Radio FM de Asunción en vivo por internet 
 Radio AM de Asunción en vivo por internet 
 Radio Ysapy 90.7 
 E40 91.1 
 Los 40 92.3  
 Radio Universal 93.9 
 RQP Paraguay 94.3 
 Radio Nacional del Paraguay 95.1 
 Rock & Pop 95.5 
 Radio Amor 95.9 
 Radio Disney 96.5 
 Radio Latina 97.1
 Yvytu FM 97.5
 Radio Nuevo Tiempo 97.9 
 Radio Yacyreta 98.5
 Radio Corazón 99.1 
 CFA Radio 99.5
 Radio Canal 100.1
 Radio Montecarlo 100.9 
 Radio Farra 101.3
 Radio Obedira 102.1 
 Radio Aspen 102.7
 FM Popular 103.1 
 Radio Cámara 104.1
 Radio Venus 105.1
 Radio Emisoras Paraguay 106.1
 Radio Urbana 106.9
 Radio María 107.3 
 Siete FM 107.7
 Palma	106.5

AM (kHz)

 Radio Uno 650 
 Radio Caritas 680 
 Radio ABC Cardinal 730 
 Radio 1º de Marzo 780
 Radio La Unión 800
 Radio Nacional del Paraguay 920
 Radio La 970
 Radio 1000 AM
 Radio Ñandutí 1020
 Radio Monumental 1080 
 La Deportiva 1120
 Rádio IPDA Paraguay 1160 
 Radio Libre 1200
 Radio Libertad 1250
 Radio Fe y Alegría 1300 
 Radio Chaco Boreal 1330
 Radio Iglesia 1480

References

Paraguay
Radio stations
Radio stations in Paraguay